Davison Community Schools is a public school district located in Genesee County, MI. The district is nationally accredited through AdvancED. In addition, Davison Community Schools serves grades PK-12 among nine buildings and is a part of the Genesee Intermediate School District as well as Saginaw Valley League for athletics.

Board of Education
The Davison Community Schools' Board of Education consists of seven members that serve six-year terms. Elections for these positions are held in the general elections and no more than three positions are open at one time. The board is responsible for handling a budget worth close to $45,000,000, 700 full-time & part-time employees, as well as planning and programming curriculum for its 5,800 students.

Board of Education members

Davison High School

Davison High School is home to the district's 9th through 12th grade students. The school has been recognized both statewide  and nationally  for its DECA and DTV News broadcasting program. The high school offers many clubs and programs that include National Honor Society, Student Council, Business Professionals of America, Key Club, Common Ground, SADD, Drama, and many more. The average ACT score is 21.3

Staff members

Davison Alternative High School

Davison Alternative High School serves students who are at risk of not graduating from a normal high school. The program at DAE runs on trimesters as opposed to four periods allowing students to regain credits that they may have lost not completing courses in a regular program.

The building that houses 150 students was renovated during the summer of 2009 which added windows and updated technology throughout the building. The renovation cost the district $1.42 million.

Staff members

Davison Middle School

Davison Middle School or DMS is Davison Community Schools' home to seventh and eighth graders. The school offers programs such as band, orchestra, choir, theater, athletics, and many other clubs.

The school was renovated in 2004 adding additional classrooms to the west side of the building and updating technology throughout the building.

Staff members

Hahn Intermediate

Hahn Intermediate is the district's newest building. Completed in 1998 the building now houses all of the district's fifth and sixth grade students. Students are able to start taking music classes while in fifth grade and are also able to participate in physical education and art courses. Hahn is also connected to Davison Middle School.

The school's gymnasium is used every year for the Davison Expo which showcases the best of Davison businesses and activities.

Staff members

Central Elementary

Central Elementary is the district's oldest building having once served as the district's high school. Today the building houses some of the district's first and fourth graders. The building also houses the district's school nurse, psychologist, social worker, and therapist.
The school received a multimillion-dollar renovation completed in April 2015, thanks to an $11.9M bond.

Staff members

Gates Elementary

Gates Elementary houses first through fourth graders for students living in the southern part of the district.

Staff members

Hill Elementary

Hill Elementary is a kindergarten through fourth grade school located near the center of the city. It also used to be the only school in the district that operates on an eleven-month schedule (year around) with breaks scattered throughout the year. Now however all of the schools run on a year round schedule.

Staff members

Siple Elementary

Siple Elementary sits on the northern boundary of Davison Community Schools and serves grades first through fourth.

The school is known throughout the district for its Super Science Day which is held annually. The program introduces elementary students to some of the basic elementary elements of science.

Staff members

Thomson Elementary

Thomson Elementary is the only building in the district to offer both developmental kindergarten and kindergarten.

Students at the school have been recipients for several years of free bike helmets that are given away in an effort to promote bicycle safety.

Staff members

References

Education in Genesee County, Michigan
School districts in Michigan
School districts established in 1907
1907 establishments in Michigan